Puerto Serrano is a city located in the province of Cádiz, Spain. According to the 2005 census, the city has a population of 6,852 inhabitants.

Leisure
Puerto Serrano is part of Vía Verde de la Sierra biking and hiking route.

Demographics

References

External links 

Puerto Serrano - Sistema de Información Multiterritorial de Andalucía

Municipalities of the Province of Cádiz